Nina Stojanović was the defending champion, but lost in the second round to Nao Hibino.

Wang Yafan won the title, after Hibino retired in the final at 3–6, 6–4, 3–3.

Seeds

Draw

Finals

Top half

Bottom half

References
Main Draw

Bank of Liuzhou Cup - Singles